Amulet is the fifth studio album by the folk band Fursaxa. It was released in 2005 on Last Visible Dog.

Track listing
"Rheine" – 9:39
"Rodeo in the Sky" – 3:56
"Crimson" – 13:39
"Song to the Cicada" – 13:03
"Tyranny" – 7:27
"Trobairitz" – 8:09
"Renounuos" – 11:39

2005 albums
Fursaxa albums